Rookery Nook is a 1930 film farce, directed by Tom Walls, with a script by Ben Travers. It is a screen adaptation of the original 1926 Aldwych farce of the same title. The film was known in the U.S. as One Embarrassing Night.

The film was very successful at the box office and led to a series of filmed farces.

Synopsis
Rhoda Marley seeks refuge overnight from a tyrannical stepfather in the house of Gerald Popkiss. He is alone there, as his wife is away; fearing a scandal he attempts to conceal Rhoda's presence from nosy domestic staff and his in-laws, with the help of his cousin Clive. Eventually all is explained, Gerald and his wife are reconciled, and Clive pairs off with Rhoda.

Cast
Gerald Popkiss – Ralph Lynn*
Clive Popkiss – Tom Walls*
Rhoda Marley  – Winifred Shotter*
Mrs Leverett – Mary Brough*
Harold Twine – Robertson Hare*
Gertrude Twine – Ethel Coleridge*
Putz  – Griffith Humphreys*
Poppy Dickey – Doreen Bendix
Clara Popkiss – Margot Grahame
Source: British Film Institute
Cast members marked * were the creators of the roles in the original stage production.

Production
The film was one of a very small number of productions made by Herbert Wilcox's British and Dominions Film Corporation in association with His Master's Voice ("The Gramophone Company", later EMI). The film used the cast of the original stage production.  HMV terminated its association with British & Dominions in 1931 out of concern that the company's participation in producing comedy films such as Rookery Nook and Splinters would demean its corporate image, of which it was very protective during the early days of the Great Depression.

Reception
Rookery Nook was voted the best British movie of 1930.

According to one report, it was the most popular British film in Britain over the previous five years.

Notes

External links

1930 films
1930 comedy films
Aldwych farce
British comedy films
British films based on plays
Films directed by Tom Walls
Films set in England
British black-and-white films
British and Dominions Studios films
Films shot at Imperial Studios, Elstree
Films shot at Rock Studios
1930s English-language films
1930s British films